Typhloditha is a genus of pseudoscorpions in the family Tridenchthoniidae. There are at least three described species in Typhloditha.

Species
These three species belong to the genus Typhloditha:
 Typhloditha anophthalma Beier, 1955
 Typhloditha minima Beier, 1959
 Typhloditha termitophila Beier, 1964

References

Further reading

External links

 

Tridenchthoniidae
Pseudoscorpion genera